Armond may refer to:

Places:
Armond, New Brunswick, Canadian community in Carleton County, New Brunswick

Given name:
Armond Budish (born 1953), the Democratic representative for the 8th district of the Ohio House of Representatives
Armond H. DeLalio (1917–1952), American Marine helicopter pilot and Navy Cross recipient
Armond Hill (born 1953), American basketball coach and retired professional basketball player
Armond J. Berthelot, French World War I flying ace credited with eleven confirmed aerial victories
Armond Smith (born 1986), American football running back for the Cleveland Browns of the National Football League
Armond White (born 1953), New York-based film and music critic
Gerard Armond Powell (born 1963) an unlikely, and for that reason, all the more compelling success story
Mario Armond Zamparelli, American artist and designer, best known for his connection with Howard Hughes 
Surname:
Dale de Armond (1914–2006), American printmaker
David A. De Armond (1844–1909), Democratic Representative representing Missouri's 12th congressional district